Arcadia Mills No. 2, now the Mayfair Lofts, is a historic mill building at 100 W. Cleveland St., Spartanburg, South Carolina. It was listed on the National Register of Historic Places in 2005.

History
The mill was the built by Spartanburg banker and pharmacist, Dr. Henry Arthur Ligon, Sr., in 1922. It opened in 1923. It was the second mill of Arcadia Mills. The mills had an adjacent mill village of Arcadia, which had about 300 houses for the mill workers.

During the Depression, the mill tried to increase production through a variety of methods such as increased hours and quickening the pace of the work. In 1932, the United Textile Workers of America (UTWA) called a strike, but it failed. The workers did not participate in a nationwide UTWA strike in 1934.

The mill was sold to  a new company, Mayfair Mills, headed by a New York cotton agent, Joshua L. Baily and Company. Arcadia No. 2 was called Baily Mill or Mayfair-Baily Mill. Frederick B. Dent became president of Mayfair Mills in 1947. In 2001, Mayfair Mills went into bankruptcy.

The mill building is currently the Mayfair Lofts apartments.

See also 
 National Register of Historic Places listings in Spartanburg County, South Carolina
 Arcadia Mill No. 1 also in Spartanburg, South Carolina

References

External links 
 Mayfair Lofts

Textile mills in South Carolina
Industrial buildings and structures on the National Register of Historic Places in South Carolina
Buildings and structures in Spartanburg, South Carolina
National Register of Historic Places in Spartanburg, South Carolina
Apartment buildings in South Carolina
Cotton mills in the United States